The men's team recurve competition in archery at the 2021 Islamic Solidarity Games will held from 15 to 17 August at the Saraçoğlu Sport Complex  in Konya.

Qualification round
Results after 216 arrows.

Elimination round
Source:

References

Men's team recurve